Greenville/Sinoe Airport  is an airport serving Greenville (also known as Sinoe), the capital of Sinoe County in southeastern Liberia.

It is also known as R.E. Murray Airport, named for Richard E. Murray, a Baptist missionary who was a delegate from Sinoe County to the 1847 constitutional convention and a signer of the 1847 Liberian Declaration of Independence.

References

External links
 

Airports in Liberia
Sinoe County